The Hall of Records is a purported ancient library claimed to lie under the Great Sphinx of Giza.  There is no evidence to indicate that it ever existed.

Overview
The story of the Hall of Records is popular among those who hold alternative theories of Ancient Egypt. The phrase "Hall of Records" originated with Edgar Cayce, an American clairvoyant, although Lynn Picknett and Clive Prince say that the idea of the existence of lost Egyptian records "has a long pedigree".

Proponents believe that an ancient Atlantean civilization stored documents under the Sphinx.  The claim is considered pseudoscientific and to be associated with the New Age movement.  Graham Hancock and Robert Bauval have promoted the idea in the book Message of the Sphinx.

No evidence of a Hall of Records was found by archaeologists investigating the site.

In fiction

The myth of the Hall of Records is featured in many creative works.

 Stel Pavlou places the location of the Hall of Records beneath the Sphinx in the Atlantis adventure novel Decipher (2001).
 In the X-Men: Evolution television series, the Hall of Records is located beneath the Great Sphinx and is actually a prison of the first mutant, Apocalypse.
 In the Generator Rex television series, the Hall of Records is Van Kleiss's laboratory when he was sent back in time.
 In Assassin's Creed Origins the Hall of Records is located beneath the Sphinx.

References

Further reading
 Zahi Hawass, H E Farouk Hosni, and Gaballa Ali Gaballa, "The Secrets of the Sphinx: الترميم بين الماضى والحاضر". American Univ in Cairo Press, 1998. 
 Garrett G. Fagan, "Archaeological Fantasies: How Pseudoarchaeology Misrepresents the Past and Misleads the Public". Routledge (UK), 2006. 417 pages.

External links
 NOVA Online/Pyramids/Read Others' Responses #2
 The Search for Hidden Chambers On the Giza Plateau, Part III: The Hall of Records by Alan Winston
 The Shaft, The Subway & The Causeway / 4
 Homepage of the late Edgar Cayce
 Waseda University Egyptian Expedition: The Pyramids Survey of Giza 

Fictional libraries
Great Sphinx of Giza
Libraries in Egypt
Pseudoarchaeology